Ali Kardor (born 16 May 1954) is an Iranian oil executive, and the former managing director of the National Iranian Oil Company (NIOC), from 2016 to 2018. Kardor joined NIOC in 1984.

Kardor was appointed managing director of NIOC in June 2016, having previously served as deputy managing director for investment and finance.

Education 
Kardor graduated with a M.S. in financial management from Allameh Tabataba'i University, Tehran.

Career 
Since Kardor has assumed management of the NIOC, it has raised oil production. Following the lifting of international trade restrictions in January 2016 – Kardor announced 4.05 million barrels of crude oil per day (bpd) by March 2018. The International Energy Agency (IEA) predicted that Iran will reach a total of 4.15 million bpd in 2022.

Prior to his appointment as managing director of NIOC, Kardor held the following positions:

 Finance and Administration Director at NIOC
 Deputy Minister of Petroleum for Commercial Affairs
 Member of the Board of Directors at the National Iranian Gas Company
 Member of the Board of Directors at Kala Naft, Tehran
 Member of the Board of Director at Kala Naft, London

References

1954 births
Living people
Iranian chief executives
National Iranian Oil Company people
Directors of the National Iranian Oil Company
Allameh Tabataba'i University alumni